The 2010 Telkom Knockout was a football (soccer) knockout competition which comprised the 16 teams in the South African Premier Soccer League. It was the 19th tournament, and the fifth under the Telkom Knockout name. The tournament is effectively South Africa's league cup, as entry is open only to clubs in the top league. The cup is usually played in the first half of the season. The tournament began on 23 October, and it ended on 4 December 2010. Kaizer Chiefs won their 9th title, by defeating Orlando Pirates 3–0 in the final at Soccer City.

In all matches there has to be a winner on the day, which will be decided if there is a winner after full-time (90 minutes). If teams are tied at full-time, then extra time is played; penalties will decide the winner if the scores are still even (there is no golden goal rule).

Teams
The 16 teams that competed in the Telkom Knockout competition are: (listed in alphabetical order).

 1. Ajax Cape Town
 2. AmaZulu
 3. Bloemfontein Celtic
 4. Free State Stars
 5.  Golden Arrows
 6. Kaizer Chiefs
 7. Mamelodi Sundowns
 8. Maritzburg United

 9. Moroka Swallows
 10. Mpumalanga Black Aces
 11. Orlando Pirates
 12. Platinum Stars
 13. Santos
 14. Supersport United
 15. Vasco da Gama
 16. Wits

Prize money

The Telkom Knockout is the highest paying cup competition in Africa with a grand total prize money of R 14 200 000.00.
 Each team taking part in the Telkom Knockout will receive a Participation Fee of R 250 000.00

First-round losers

 Prize Money: R 200 000.00
 Participation Fee: R 250 000.00
Total: R 450 000.00 for 8 teams each

Losing quarterfinalists

 Prize Money: R 400 000.00
 Participation Fee: R 250 000.00
Total: R 650 000.00 for 4 teams each

Losing Semi-Finalists

 Prize Money: R 750 000.00
 Participation Fee: R 250 000.00
Total: R 1 000 000.00 for 2 teams each

Final  –  runner up

 Prize Money: R 1 500 000.00
 Participation Fee: R 250 000.00
Total: R 1 750 000.00

Final  –  winner

 Prize Money: R 4 000 000.00
 Participation Fee: R 250 000.00
Total: R 4 250 000.00

‘‘Total prize money’’

 Total Prize Money: R 10 200 000.00
 Total Participation Fee: R 4 000 000.00
Grand Total: R 14 200 000.00

Results

First round
The draw for the first round was done on 11 October 2010. The first round matches took place on 23, 24 and 27 October.

Quarter-finals
The draw for the quarter-finals was done on 28 October 2010. The quarter-finals took place on 6 and 7 November.

Semi-finals
The draw for the semi-finals was done on 7 November 2010, following the Maritzburg United vs Mamelodi Sundowns match. The semi-finals took place on 20 and 21 November.

Final

Top scorers

References

External links
Telkom Knockout Cup Official Website
Telkom Official Website
Premier Soccer League
South African Football Association
Confederation of African Football

See also
Telkom Knockout
South African Football Association

Telkom Knockout
Telkom Knockout, 2010
Telkom Knockout